Harije is a village in the hills west of Ilirska Bistrica in the Inner Carniola region of Slovenia, which is the site of several mass war graves.

Geography
Harije is an elongated village on a hill ridge in the southeast part of the Brkini region along the road from Ilirska Bistrica to Podgrad. It lies at a watershed; springs flow to the south into Klivnik Creek and to the north into Posrtev Creek. Grmada Hill (516 m) stands east of the village and Ded Hill (576 m) to the west. Most of the cultivated land lies to the west and east, separated by meadows and pastures.

History
During the Second World War there was a Partisan checkpoint in the village. The Partisans operated a kitchen and had several bunkers in the village.

Mass graves
Harije is the site of four unmarked mass graves from the end of the Second World War. They all contain the remains of German soldiers from the 97th Corps that fell at the beginning of May 1945. The Cemetery Mass Grave is located outside the north cemetery wall in the village. It contains the remains of four soldiers. It contains the remains of four soldiers. It contains the remains of two or three soldiers. It contains the remains of one soldier.

Church

The parish church in the settlement is dedicated to Saint Stephen and belongs to the Koper Diocese.

Notable people
Notable people that were born or lived in Harije include:
Franc Bilc (1786–1824), lexicographer
Alojz Mihelčič (1880–1975), musician

References

External links
Harije on Geopedia

Populated places in the Municipality of Ilirska Bistrica